Monolobus is a genus of ground beetles in the family Carabidae. There are at least two described species in Monolobus.

Species
These two species belong to the genus Monolobus:
 Monolobus ovalipennis Straneo, 1969  (Chile)
 Monolobus testaceus Solier, 1849  (Argentina and Chile)

References

Migadopinae